Polypsocus is a genus of hairy-winged barklice in the family Amphipsocidae. There are more than 20 described species in Polypsocus.

Species
These 22 species belong to the genus Polypsocus:

 Polypsocus bimaculatus Enderlein, 1925
 Polypsocus coleopterus Roesler, 1940
 Polypsocus collinsi Turner, 1984
 Polypsocus corruptus (Hagen, 1861)
 Polypsocus delunatus Roesler, 1940
 Polypsocus desectus (Enderlein, 1900)
 Polypsocus falcifer Roesler, 1940
 Polypsocus fasciatus Banks, 1908
 Polypsocus fastosus Roesler, 1940
 Polypsocus fuscopterus Mockford, 1991
 Polypsocus fuscus (Enderlein, 1900)
 Polypsocus griseolineatus (Enderlein, 1900)
 Polypsocus jujuyensis Garcia Aldrete, 2009
 Polypsocus lineatus Mockford, 1991
 Polypsocus lunulatus Enderlein, 1900
 Polypsocus nervulosus Enderlein, 1909
 Polypsocus ohausianus (Enderlein, 1909)
 Polypsocus quadriguttatus (Enderlein, 1900)
 Polypsocus selenius Roesler, 1940
 Polypsocus serpentinus Mockford, 1991
 Polypsocus suffuscus Roesler, 1940
 Polypsocus unicolor Roesler, 1940

References

External links

 

Caeciliusetae
Articles created by Qbugbot